Bidesiya is a Bhojpuri film based on the Play of same name written by Bhikhari Thakur. The film was released in 1963 and was directed by S. N. Tripathi produced by Bachubhai Shah.

Cast 
 Kumari Naaz as Parvati
 Sujit Kumar as Bidesi Thakur
 Jeevan as Chhote Thakur
 Padma Khanna as Chhoti Malkin
 Helen as Dancer in Nautanki
 Bela Bose as Kaharan Dancer
 Sohanlal
 Sadhana Roychoudhury
 Sulochana Chatterjee
 Sheelkumar
 S.N. Tripathi
 Mukhtar Ahmed
 Rani
 T.N. Sinha

Music 
The score and soundtrack for film was composed by S. N. Tripathi and lyrics were written by Ram Moorti Chaturvedi. The tracks in this film are:

See also 
 Bhojpuri Film Industry
 List of Bhojpuri films

References

External links
 

1963 films
1960s Indian films
1960s Bhojpuri-language films